The following is a list of Grammy Awards winners and nominees from Japan:

Notes

References

Japanese
Grammy